The Paris Orioles were a  minor league baseball team based in Paris, Texas. From 1955 to 1957, the Orioles played as members of the Class D level Sooner State League League as a minor league affiliate of the Baltimore Orioles. Hosting home games at the City Ball Park, the Orioles qualified for the playoffs in all three seasons of play, winning the 1957 pennant.  The Orioles were the final minor league team based in Paris. There were numerous prior Paris minor league teams, after Paris first hosted a minor league baseball in 1896.

History
Minor League baseball began in Paris, Texas with the 1896 Paris Midlands of the Texas Association.

The Orioles were immediately preceded by the Paris Indians, who played in 1952 and 1953, as members of the Class D level Big State League.

The Paris Orioles were members of the eight-team Class D level Sooner State League from 1955 to 1957. After making the playoffs with 4th place finishes in their first two seasons, the Orioles captured the 1957 Sooner State League pennant. Paris joined the Ardmore Cardinals, Gainesville Owls, Lawton Braves, McAlester Rockets, Muskogee Giants, Seminole Oilers and Shawnee Hawks in beginning league play on April 19, 1955.

In 1955, the Orioles placed 4th in the Sooner State League regular season with a record of 68–69 and finished 26.0 games behind the pennant winning Lawton Braves. In the first round of the four–team playoffs, Paris was eliminated by the eventual champion Lawton Braves 3 games to 1. Paris was managed by Jimmy Adair.

Continuing Sooner State League play in 1956, the Orioles again finished the regular season in 4th place in the Sooner State League regular season standings, playing under returning manager Jimmy Adair and Barney Lutz. Paris ended the regular season with a 72–67 record and finished 11.0 games behind the pennant winning Ardmore Cardinals. In the playoffs, the Ardmore Cardinals defeated Paris 3 games to 2 in the 1st round.

In their final season of play, the 1957 Paris Orioles won the Sooner State League pennant and advanced to the league Finals. After a 74–51 1957 regular season record, under returning manager Barney Lutz and Billy Capps, the Paris Orioles finished 0.5 games ahead of the Ardmore Cardinals. In the playoffs, the Orioles defeated the Shawnee Hawks 3 games to 1 in their first round playoff series. The Orioles were swept by Ardmore  4 games to 0 in the championship series in the final games of the franchise.

The Sooner State League permanently folded following the completion of the 1957 season. Paris, Texas has not hosted another minor league team.

The ballpark
From 1946 to 1957, the Orioles and their predecessor Paris Red Peppers (1946–1947), Paris Rockets (1948), Paris Panthers (1949–1950), and Paris Indians (1952–1953) teams hosted home minor league games at City Ball Park. The ballpark had a noted capacity of 4,000.

Timeline

Season–by–season

Notable alumni

Jimmy Adair (1955, MGR)
Steve Barber (1957), Baltimore Orioles Hall of Fame
Barney Lutz (1956, MGR)
 Roger Marquis (1957)
Barry Shetrone (1956)

See also
Paris Orioles players

References

External links
Baseball Reference

Defunct minor league baseball teams
Baltimore Orioles minor league affiliates
Paris, Texas
Professional baseball teams in Texas
Defunct baseball teams in Texas
Baseball teams disestablished in 1957
Baseball teams established in 1955